Gift Loveday Igbomgbo, known professionally as MC Aproko, is a Nigerian stand-up comedian. He is the winner of Next Naija Comedy Star and currently the special assistant on entertainment to the governor of Bayelsa State, Douye Diri, since 24 December 2020.

Career
On 2 December 2017, MC Aproko won Comedy Central 'Grab The Mic' with Maltina held at Eko Convention Centre and received ₦1.5 million. On 6 May 2018, he won Ibile Comedy Challenge held at Eko Convention Centre and organized by the Lagos State government, receiving ₦1 million.

On 20 December 2020, MC Aproko won Next Naija Comedy Star organized by Ayo Makun, receiving ₦5 million and a car.

On 23 December 2020, he was appointed special assistant on entertainment by the governor of Bayelsa State, Douye Diri.

Personal life
MC Aproko was born in Port Harcourt, Rivers State, but grew up at Nembe, Bayelsa State. He is a native of Bayelsa State, the second son and fifth born in a family of seven.

See also 
 List of Nigerian comedians

References

Living people
Nigerian male comedians
People from Bayelsa State
Year of birth missing (living people)